Gilabad may refer to:
 Gilabad, Hamadan
 Gilabad, Mazandaran